is a former Japanese football player and manager.

Playing career
Okuno was born in Kyoto on 13 November 1968. After graduating from Waseda University, he joined Kashima Antlers in 1993. He played many matches as center back with Yutaka Akita for a long time and made the beginning of the golden era of the club. The club won the champions 1996, 1998 J1 League, 1997 J.League Cup and 1997 Emperor's Cup. In 2000, he moved to newly was promoted to J1 League club, Kawasaki Frontale. He played as center back of three backs defense. Although the club finished at bottom place in the league, the club won the 2nd place in J.League Cup. In 2001, he moved to Sanfrecce Hiroshima. In 2002, he moved to Prefectural Leagues club Thespa Kusatsu and became a playing manager. The club was promoted to Regional Leagues in 2003 and Japan Football League in 2004. He retired end of 2003 season.

Coaching career
In 2002, Okuno signed with Prefectural Leagues club Thespa Kusatsu and became a playing manager. The club was promoted to Regional Leagues in 2003 and Japan Football League in 2004. However he retired from playing career and left the club end of 2003 season. In 2004, he returned to his old club Kashima Antlers and became a coach. The club won the champions for 3 years in a row (2007–2009). In 2012, he moved to J2 League club Montedio Yamagata and became a manager. He managed the club until 2013.

Club statistics

Managerial statistics

References

External links
 
 
 biglobe.ne.jp

1968 births
Living people
Waseda University alumni
Association football people from Kyoto Prefecture
Japanese footballers
J1 League players
Kashima Antlers players
Kawasaki Frontale players
Sanfrecce Hiroshima players
Thespakusatsu Gunma players
Japanese football managers
J2 League managers
Thespakusatsu Gunma managers
Montedio Yamagata managers
Association football defenders